Matt Reid and John-Patrick Smith were the defending champions but chose not to defend their title.

André Göransson and Florian Lakat won the title after defeating Marcelo Arévalo and Miguel Ángel Reyes-Varela 6–4, 6–4 in the final.

Seeds

Draw

References
 Main Draw
 Qualifying Draw

Tiburon Challenger - Doubles
2017 Doubles